Mentzelia is a genus of about 60-70 species of flowering plants in the family Loasaceae, native to the Americas. The genus comprises annual, biennial, and perennial herbaceous plants and a few shrubs.

They are commonly called blazing stars or stickleafs; other names include evening stars and moonflowers.

Selected species

Mentzelia affinis Greene – Yellowcomet
Mentzelia albescens (Gillies & Arn.) Griseb.
Mentzelia albicaulis (Douglas ex Hook.) Douglas ex Torr. & A.Gray – Whitestem blazingstar
Mentzelia aspera L.
Mentzelia candelariae H.J. Thomp. & Prigge – Candelaria blazingstar
Mentzelia chrysantha Engelm. ex Brandegee 
Mentzelia congesta Nutt. ex Torr. & A.Gray – United blazingstar
Mentzelia conzattii Greenm.
Mentzelia cordifolia Dombey ex Urb. & Gilg
Mentzelia crocea Kellogg – Sierra blazingstar
Mentzelia decapetala (Pursh ex Sims) Urb. & Gilg – Tenpetal blazingstar
Mentzelia densa Greene
Mentzelia desertorum (Davidson) H.J. Thomp. & Roberts – Desert blazingstar
Mentzelia dispersa S.Watson – Mada stickleaf
Mentzelia eremophila – Pinyon blazingstar
Mentzelia fendleriana Urb. & Gilg
Mentzelia goodrichii Thorne & S.L. Welsh  – Goodrich's blazingstar
Mentzelia gracilenta – Grass blazingstar
Mentzelia hirsutissima
 Mentzelia hirsutissima var. nesiotes
Mentzelia hispida
Mentzelia involucrata – Sand blazingstar, white-bract blazingstar
Mentzelia inyoensis – Inyo blazingstar
Mentzelia jonesii – Jones' blazingstar
Mentzelia laevicaulis (Douglas ex Hook.) Torr. & A.Gray – Giant blazingstar
Mentzelia leucophylla Brandegee
Mentzelia lindleyi Torr. & A.Gray - Lindley's blazingstar
Mentzelia memorabilis N. H. Holmgren & P. K. Holmgren - Nine-eleven blazingstar, September 11 stickleaf 
Mentzelia micrantha – San Luis blazingstar
Mentzelia mollis M.Peck
Mentzelia montana – Variegated-bract blazingstar
Mentzelia multiflora (Nutt.) A.Gray – Adonis blazingstar
Mentzelia nitens – Shining blazingstar
Mentzelia nuda (Pursh) Torr. & A.Gray
Mentzelia oligosperma Nutt. ex Sims
Mentzelia oreophila – Argus blazingstar
Mentzelia packardiae Glad
Mentzelia parvifolia Urb. & Gilg ex Kurtz
Mentzelia pectinata – San Joaquin blazingstar
Mentzelia polita – Polished blazingstar
Mentzelia pterosperma
Mentzelia pumila  Nutt. ex. Torr. & A. Gray – Dwarf mentzelia
Mentzelia reflexa – Reflexed blazingstar
Mentzelia rhizomata Reveal
Mentzelia scabra Kunth
Mentzelia springeri – Santa Fe blazingstar
Mentzelia tiehmii
Mentzelia todiltoensis
Mentzelia torreyi – Torrey's blazingstar
Mentzelia tricuspis – Spinyhair blazingstar
Mentzelia veatchiana – Veatch's blazingstar

References

Flora of Bolivia checklist: Mentzelia
Flora of Missouri checklist: Mentzelia

 
Flora of North America
Cornales genera
Taxa named by Carl Linnaeus